Mehdi Mohammadzadeh is an Iranian footballer who plays for Aluminium Hormozgan in the Iranian Premier League.

Club career
Mohammadzadeh moved to Naft Tehran F.C. in 2009 after spending the previous season with F.C. Aboumoslem of the Iran Pro League.

 Assists

References

Living people
Iranian footballers
F.C. Aboomoslem players
Naft Tehran F.C. players
Homa F.C. players
Shahrdari Tabriz players
Aluminium Hormozgan F.C. players
Association football midfielders
Year of birth missing (living people)